Jerrel Venetiaan (born March 9, 1971) is a retired Dutch kickboxer and mixed martial artist who fought in K-1. As a MMA fighter he fought in Pride Fighting Championships.

Championships and accomplishments

Kickboxing
2004 King Of The Ring World GP runner up
2003 King Of The Ring Europe GP runner up
2003 K-1 World Grand Prix 2003 in Basel Champion
2001 K-1 Holland GP 2001 in Arnhem Champion
WKA European professional champion

Failed drug test

K-1 World Grand Prix 2003 in Basel
On May 30, 2003, Venetiaan failed a drug test prior to K-1 World Grand Prix 2003 in Basel. He tested positive for elevated testosterone. The test indicated Venetiaan's testosterone level was 500 times higher before winning the tournament trophy.

Records

Kickboxing record

Mixed martial arts record

|-
| Win
| align=center| 4–3 (1)
| Joop Kasteel
| KO (punches)
| 2H2H 6 - Simply the Best 6
| 
| align=center| 1
| align=center| 6:28
| Rotterdam, Netherlands
| 
|-
| Loss
| align=center| 3–3 (1)
| Hirotaka Yokoi
| Submission (armbar)
| Pride 23
| 
| align=center| 2
| align=center| 3:29
| Tokyo, Japan
| 
|-
| Win
| align=center| 3–2 (1)
| Daijiro Matsui
| Decision (split)
| Pride Shockwave
| 
| align=center| 3
| align=center| 5:00
| Tokyo, Japan
| 
|-
| Loss
| align=center| 2–2 (1)
| Valentijn Overeem
| Submission (heel hook)
| It's Showtime - Christmas Edition
| 
| align=center| 1
| align=center| 1:27
| Haarlem, Netherlands
| 
|-
| Win
| align=center| 2–1 (1)
| Dave van der Veen
| Decision (unanimous)
| Rings Holland: Di Capo Di Tutti Capi
| 
| align=center| 2
| align=center| 5:00
| Utrecht City, Netherlands
| 
|-
| Loss
| align=center| 1–1 (1)
| Bob Schrijber
| KO (punch)
| It's Showtime - It's Showtime
| 
| align=center| 1
| align=center| 3:42
| Haarlem, Netherlands
| 
|-
|  NC
| align=center| 1–0 (1)
| Ricardo Fyeet
| No Contest
| Rings Holland: The Kings of the Magic Ring
| 
| align=center| 1
| align=center| 1:08
| Utrecht City, Netherlands
| 
|-
| Win
| align=center| 1–0
| Dave van der Veen
| TKO (punches)
| Rings Holland: Judgement Day
| 
| align=center| 2
| align=center| 2:40
| Amsterdam, Netherlands
|

References

1971 births
Living people
Dutch male kickboxers
Dutch male mixed martial artists
Mixed martial artists utilizing kickboxing
Dutch sportspeople of Surinamese descent
Dutch sportspeople in doping cases
Place of birth missing (living people)
Doping cases in kickboxing
20th-century Dutch people
21st-century Dutch people